Camex (IATA code: Z7) is a cargo airline based at Tbilisi, Georgia's Tbilisi International Airport. The airline was established in 2020 by parent company Camex International, a cargo company. Camex uses Boeing 737-800 Converted Freighter aircraft.

History 
On May 8, 2022, Camex received their air operator's certificate from the Georgian Civil Aviation Administration.

Camex received its first aircraft, a former Ryanair machine that was in Guangzhou, China, on July 7 of that year. The airplane is owned by Nomura, Babcock and Brown, which leases it to the Georgian airline.

The airline was formally launched on August 1, 2022, in an event that was attended by, among many others, United States ambassador to Georgia, Kelly Degnan.

References 

2020 establishments in Georgia (country)
Airlines of Georgia (country)
Cargo airlines